The 1994 All-Big Ten Conference football team consists of American football players chosen as All-Big Ten Conference players for the 1994 NCAA Division I-A football season.

Offensive selections

Quarterbacks
 Kerry Collins, Penn State (AP-1)
 Todd Collins, Michigan (AP-2)

Running backs
 Ki-Jana Carter Penn State (AP-1)
 Chris Darkins, Minnesota (AP-1)
 Mike Alstott, Purdue (AP-2)
 Alex Smith, Indiana (AP-2)

Centers
 Cory Raymer, Wisconsin (AP-1)
 Bucky Greeley, Penn State (AP-2)

Guards
 Jeff Hartings, Penn State (AP-1)
 Joe Rudolph, Wisconsin (AP-1)
 Andrew Greene, Indiana (AP-2)
 Matt O'Dwyer, Northwestern (AP-2)

Tackles
 Korey Stringer, Ohio State (AP-1)
 Mike Verstegen, Wisconsin (AP-1)
 Shane Hannah, Michigan State (AP-2)
 Brian DeMarco, Michigan State (AP-2)

Tight ends
 Kyle Brady, Penn State (AP-1)
 Ken Dilger, Illinois (AP-2)

Receivers
 Bobby Engram, Penn State (AP-1)
 Amani Toomer, Michigan (AP-1)
 Joey Galloway, Ohio State (AP-2)
 Freddie Scott, Penn State (AP-2)

Defensive selections

Defensive linemen
 Simeon Rice, Illinois (AP-1)
 Kevin Hardy, Illinois (AP-1)
 Matt Finkes, Ohio State (AP-1)
 Mike Thompson, Wisconsin (AP-1)
 Mike Vrabel, Ohio State (AP-1)
 Trent Zenkewicz, Michigan (AP-2)
 Todd Atkins, Penn State (AP-2)
 Parker Wildeman, Iowa (AP-2)
 Phil Yeboah-Kodie, Penn State (AP-2)
 Jason Maniecki, Wisconsin (AP-2)

Linebackers
 Dana Howard, Illinois (AP-1)
 Lorenzo Styles, Ohio State (AP-1)
 Steve Morrison, Michigan (AP-1)
 Brian Gelzheiser, Penn State (AP-2)
 John Holecek, Illinois (AP-2)
 Alfonzo Thurman, Indiana (AP-2)

Defensive backs
 Ty Law, Michigan (AP-1)
 Jeff Messenger, Wisconsin (AP-1)
 Brian Miller, Penn State (AP-1)
 Demetrice Martin, Michigan State (AP-2)
 Marlon Kemer, Ohio State (AP-2)
 Tony Pittman, Penn State (AP-2)

Special teams

Kickers
 Remy Hamilton, Michigan (AP-1)
 Mike Chalberg, Minnesota (AP-2)

Punters
 Paul Burton, Northwestern (AP-1)
 Scott Terna, Ohio State (AP-2)

Key
AP = Associated Press

See also
1994 College Football All-America Team

References

All-Big Ten Conference
All-Big Ten Conference football teams